The 1989–90 Pilkington Cup was the 19th edition of England's premier rugby union club competition at that time. Bath won the competition defeating Gloucester in the final. The Bath victory was the biggest winning margin of any previous final, helped by the fact that Gloucester's John Gadd was dismissed from the field after 57 minutes for stamping on Dave Egerton. The event was sponsored by Pilkington and the final was held at Twickenham Stadium.

Draw and results

First round

Away team progress*

Second round

Third round

Fourth round

Quarter-finals

Semi-finals

Final

References

1989–90 rugby union tournaments for clubs
1989–90 in English rugby union
1989-90